Polygonia oreas, the oreas comma, is a butterfly of the family Nymphalidae. It is found in North America in the mountains from southern British Columbia and southwestern Alberta to northern California.

The wingspan is 42–52 mm. The butterfly flies from June to October depending on the location. Its habitats include coastal redwood forests and mountain conifer forests.

The larvae feed on Ribes species. Adults feed on tree sap and rotting fruit; they rarely feed on flower nectar.

Similar species
Green comma (P. faunus)
Grey comma (P. progne)

References

External links

Oreas comma, Butterflies and Skippers of North America
Oreas comma, Butterflies of Canada

Nymphalini
Butterflies of North America
Taxa named by William Henry Edwards
Butterflies described in 1869